The Bathurst Mining Camp is a mining district in northeast New Brunswick, Canada, centred in the Nepisiguit River valley, and near to Bathurst.  The camp hosts 45 known volcanogenic massive sulfide (VMS) deposits typical of the Appalachian Mountains. Some of the ore is smelted at the Belledune facility of Xstrata. Although the primary commodity is zinc, the massive-sulphide ore body produces lead, zinc, copper, silver, gold, bismuth, antimony and cadmium.

History

Loring Bailey, the professor of geology at UNB in 1864, wrote that: 

The Bathurst Mining Camp was the location of an iron mine, for a time ending early in the 20th century. The Northern New Brunswick and Seaboard (NNB&S) railroad was built from the Intercolonial Railway line near Bathurst approximately 17 miles up the Nepisiguit River to service the mines, but had a short history, terminating in 1918 when it officially ceased operation due to the closure of the iron mine in 1913.  The railroad passed into the hands of the provincial government, who were the guarantors of the bonds financing the NNB&S.  By 1959 the provincial government had all of the remaining rails lifted.

A massive Sulfide orebody was discovered in 1953.

In 1963 the 14 mile line to Brunswick Mines from Nepisiguit Junction was rebuilt by Canadian National Railways to serve the then-projected zinc mine resulting from the 1953 discovery.

Zinc production at Brunswick Mine began in 1964.

On 9 March 1987, a derailment occurred at Nepisiguit Junction when a runaway CN ore train journeyed from Brunswick Mines to just short of the wye. There was an error in communications with the mine staff and the engineer, Wesley Macdonald, ended up with more cars on his train than he thought, and the older brakes on the lead engine alone were unable to hold the train on the grade in the Brunswick Mines yard. After a harrowing journey at speeds up to 70 mph the engines derailed on the sharp curve into the wye at Nepisiguit Junction. Both units and most of the 30-car train derailed, but the engineer was not seriously injured.

The zinc mine operated continuously since 1964 until April 2013, surviving economic stagnation and four major changes in ownership to produce approximately 150 million tonnes of ore at grades of 8.46% Zn, 3.33% Pb, 0.37% Cu, and 99 g/t Ag.

Geology

The Geology of the Bathurst Mining Camp (BMC) is a base metal copper, lead and zinc mainly volcanogenic hosted mineral rich area of north central New Brunswick.  BMC geology is diverse having experienced considerable tectonic activity from the Ordovician to the Jurassic periods.

Geological activity accumulated sulfide minerals into local vent complex sea floor basalts, creating VHMS volcanogenic hosted massive sulfide and SEDEX sedimentary exhalative deposit depositional environments, which were all later accreted and folded onto the margin of the continental crust which formed the Appalachian Mountains during numerous mountain building events.  Additionally the east coast was a highly active regional geological zone experiencing volcanism similar to the Yellowstone along the edge of the Appalachian Mountains of New Brunswick and Maine.

The BMC land area is the grave yards of both the Iapetus and Rheic ocean basins which were subducted under the thicker continental crust and down into the mantle.

The region is mainly known for VHMS and SEDEX environments while it also hosts epithermal, mesothermal and a number of other mineral deposit forming environments. VHMS and SEDEX environments are the primary mineral hosting dynamics producing base and precious metals. Gold and silver are generally low grade associated with zinc and lead rich areas. The gold and silver are present as invisible disseminations within other minerals.

The BMC country rock is also highly intruded by magma plumes. One such plume is on Mount Edward, part of the Notre Dame Mountains, which was exposed by glacial erosion.

Faults
In 2007 there were commonly held to be four major fault lines in the area. The Miramichi fault was the site on 9 January 1982 of a significant earthquake. 
Rocky Brook-Millstream fault, near the Millstream River and falls
Heath Steele fault
Catamaran fault
Miramichi fault

Deposits
Nepisiquit A, B, C
Camelback
Halfmile Lake
Orvan Brook
Volcanogenic Massive Sulphides

Mines
Brunswick 12 mine
Brunswick 6 mine
Heath Steele Mines
Wedge Mine
Chester Mine
Key Anacon Mine
Austin Brook Iron Mine
Murray Brook Mine
CNE Mine
Caribou zinc mine
Stratmat Boundary Mine
Halfmile mine
Restigouche

See also
 James Boylen
 Edward Gerald Byrne
 Kenneth Colin Irving
 Louis Robichaud

References

Bibliography

Mines in New Brunswick
Bathurst, New Brunswick
Volcanism of New Brunswick
Geography of Gloucester County, New Brunswick